The Serbian Unity Congress is a non-profit Serb diaspora international organization. It was established in 1990 in response to the political events in Yugoslavia. Its stated long-term goal is to contribute to democratization and reconstruction of the Serbian territories. With its main office located in Washington, DC, the Serbian Unity Congress also has an office in Belgrade, Serbia and representation in Vienna, Austria and through its worldwide chapters.

External links
Official website - 2014 (WayBackMachine)

See also
Serbian Americans
Ethnic interest groups in the United States

Serbian-American history
Serbian diaspora
Serb diaspora
Serb organizations